Grab It Here was a chain of cash and carry stores that existed from 1903 to the end of the 20th century in Illinois and Indiana.

C. Sherman Paxton moved to Illinois from Kentucky as a coal miner around 1901.  He began saving money to open his own grocery store. By 1903, he had saved $185 ( in modern terms) and opened a small store in Georgetown, Illinois.  The store was originally called simply the "C. S. Paxton Store", and he ran it on credit and made deliveries; Paxton closed the store for a time during a coal strike but returned later and opened the store again.  

In 1919, Paxton opened a cash-only store managed by his son Ernie and it was here that the "Grab-It-Here" name first appeared.  By the 1930s, there were several cash and carry stores in operation. By 1941, that grew to a chain of 40 stores. In 1968, Grab-It-Here became affiliated with Dolly Madison Industries.  By the 1980s, the chain was defunct.

C. S. Paxton died in 1950.

Locations
Here is a list of stores according to an anniversary brochure from the 1960s:

References

 Grab-It-Here anniversary booklets from the 1950s and 1960s, courtesy of the Vermilion County Historical Society
 The Heritage of Vermilion County magazine, published by the Vermilion County Museum Society

Companies disestablished in the 1970s
Retail companies established in 1903
Defunct retail companies of the United States
Defunct companies based in Illinois
Privately held companies based in Illinois
Vermilion County, Illinois